Ary Rigo (15 November 1946 – 30 September 2021) was a Brazilian agronomist and politician. A member of the Brazilian Social Democracy Party, he served as Vice-Governor of Mato Grosso do Sul from 1991 to 1994. He was also President of the Legislative Assembly of Mato Grosso do Sul from 2001 to 2003.

References

1946 births
2021 deaths
Brazilian politicians
Brazilian agronomists
Brazilian Social Democracy Party politicians
Members of state legislatures of Brazil
People from Rio Grande do Sul